The Undisputed British Tag Team Championship is a professional wrestling championship owned by the Revolution Pro Wrestling (RevPro/RPW) promotion. The title was created and debuted on 17 July 2005. The inaugural champions were AK-47 (Ashe and Kris Linell).  The current champions are Greedy Souls (Brendan White and Danny Jones), who are in their first reign, both as a team and individually.

Title history
The inaugural champions were AK-47
(Ashe and Kris Linell). The team of Aussie Open, The Kartel, The Leaders of the New School and The Thrillers have the most reigns as a team at two, while individually, Joel Redman and Sha Samuels have the most with four. The team with the longest reign is The Leaders of the New School (Marty Scurll and Zack Sabre Jr.), who held the title for 630 days, while the shortest reign belongs to The Inner City Machine Guns (Rich Swann and Ricochet), who held the title for 1 days. 

The current champions are Greedy Souls (Brendan White and Danny Jones), who are in their first reign, both as a team and individually. They defeated Sunshine Machine (Chuck Mambo and TK Cooper) on Live In London on 23 October 2022, in London, England.

Reign

Combined reigns 

By team

By wrestler

See also

Professional wrestling in the United Kingdom
British Heavyweight Championship
British Cruiserweight Championship

References

External links
Official title history
 RevPro Undisputed British Tag Team Championship

International Pro Wrestling: United Kingdom championships
Revolution Pro Wrestling championships
Tag team wrestling championships
National professional wrestling championships
Professional wrestling in the United Kingdom